Brecon was a parliamentary constituency in Wales which returned one Member of Parliament (MP)  to the House of Commons of the Parliament of the United Kingdom and its predecessors, from 1542 until it was abolished for the 1885 general election.

Boundaries
From its first election in 1542 until some time before 1715, the constituency consisted of a number of boroughs within the historic county of Brecknockshire or Breconshire in Wales. From then until 1885 the seat represented the parliamentary borough of Brecon alone. The constituency should not be confused with the county constituency of Breconshire, which existed from the sixteenth century until 1918.

On the basis of information from several volumes of the History of Parliament, it is apparent that the history of the borough representation from Wales and Monmouthshire is more complicated than that of the English boroughs.

The Laws in Wales Act 1535 (26 Hen. VIII, c. 26) provided for a single borough seat for each of 11 of the 12 Welsh counties and Monmouthshire. The legislation was ambiguous as to which communities were enfranchised. The county towns were awarded a seat, but this in some fashion represented all the ancient boroughs of the county as the others were required to contribute to the member's wages. It was not clear if the burgesses of the contributing boroughs could take part in the election. The only election under the original scheme was for the 1542 Parliament. It seems that only burgesses from the county towns actually took part. An Act of 1544 (35 Hen. VIII, c. 11) confirmed that the contributing boroughs could send representatives to take part in the election at the county town. As far as can be told from surviving indentures of returns, the degree to which the out boroughs participated varied, but by the end of the sixteenth century all the seats had some participation from them at some elections at least.

The original scheme was modified by later legislation and decisions of the House of Commons (which were sometimes made with no regard to precedent or evidence: for example in 1728 it was decided that only the freemen of the borough of Montgomery could participate in the election for that seat, thus disenfranchising the freemen of Llanidloes, Welshpool and Llanfyllin).

In the case of Breconshire, the county town and principal borough was Brecon. One ward of the principal borough was an exclave; namely Trecastle, in the township of Llywel eleven miles west of the main town. There is no evidence that any other boroughs in Breconshire actually took part in elections before 1597. The out boroughs then participating were Builth (now known as Builth Wells), Crickhowel or Crickhowell, Hay (now Hay-on-Wye) and Telgarth or Talgarth.

At some point between 1603 and 1715 the out boroughs ceased to participate in elections for the constituency. Until 1727 all the freemen of Brecon formed the electorate, but in 1727 the House of Commons ruled that only the resident freemen could vote. There had been about 180 electors in 1723 and 1727, but only 69 in 1744 after the basis of the franchise had been changed. There were about 100 voters between 1754 and 1790.

Later history
When registration of electors and an additional householder franchise were introduced in 1832, the constituency, still based on the town of Brecon, had the smallest electorate in Wales with just 242 registered voters.

Brecon was little affected by the upsurge of radical politics in the 1860s apart from the one occasion in 1866 when Thomas Price, the prominent nonconformist minister, intervened in a by-election contest to compel the Liberal candidate, the Earl of Brecknock, to issue an address more strongly in favour of reform.

Even after the extension of the franchise in 1868, the number of voters only increased to 814. This did, however, result in one of the most tumultuous elections in the history of the borough, which included a torchlight procession and lively meetings at which speakers struggled to make themselves heard. On election day it was generally accepted that supporters of the Conservative candidate, Howel Gwyn, had been caught engaged in bribery. His unseating by petition in April 1869 indicated how Brecon largely remained a closed borough, dominated by the politics of influence.

After 1885 Breconshire was represented in Parliament by the single member county constituency, which included all the boroughs formerly in the Brecon constituency.

Members of Parliament

MPs 1542–1640 
As there were sometimes significant gaps between Parliaments held in this period, the dates of first assembly and dissolution are given. Where the name of the member has not yet been ascertained or (before 1558) is not recorded in a surviving document, the entry unknown is entered in the table.

The Roman numerals after some names are those used in The House of Commons 1509–1558 to distinguish a member from another politician of the same name.

MPs 1640–1660
This sub-section includes the Long Parliament and the Rump Parliament, together with the Parliaments of the Commonwealth and the Protectorate (before the Convention Parliament of 1660).

MPs 1660–1885

Elections

Elections in the 1830s

Elections in the 1840s

Elections in the 1850s

Morgan's death caused a by-election.

Elections in the 1860s

Watkins' death caused a by-election.

Pratt succeeded to the peerage, becoming 3rd Marquess of Camden, causing a by-election.

 

 

The election was declared void on petition, causing a by-election.

Elections in the 1870s
Villiers succeeded to the peerage, becoming Earl of Clarendon, causing a by-election.

Elections in the 1880s

References

Bibliography
 Boundaries of Parliamentary Constituencies 1885–1972, compiled and edited by F.W.S. Craig (Parliamentary Reference Publications 1972)
 British Parliamentary Election Results 1832–1885, compiled and edited by F.W.S. Craig (Macmillan Press 1977)
 The House of Commons 1509–1558, by S.T. Bindoff (Secker & Warburg 1982)
 The House of Commons 1558–1603, by P.W. Hasler (HMSO 1981)
 The House of Commons 1715–1754, by Romney Sedgwick (HMSO 1970)
 The House of Commons 1754–1790, by Sir Lewis Namier and John Brooke (HMSO 1964)
 The Parliaments of England by Henry Stooks Smith (1st edition published in three volumes 1844–50), second edition edited (in one volume) by F.W.S. Craig (Political Reference Publications 1973)

History of Brecknockshire
Constituencies of the Parliament of the United Kingdom established in 1542
Constituencies of the Parliament of the United Kingdom disestablished in 1885
Historic parliamentary constituencies in Mid Wales
1542 establishments in Wales
1885 disestablishments in Wales